Commatica parmulata is a moth in the family Gelechiidae. It was described by Edward Meyrick in 1914. It is found in Guyana and Brazil.

The wingspan is about 11 mm. The forewings are dark violet fuscous, suffused in the disc with light glossy blue and with an oblique blackish mark beneath the fold at one-fourth. The stigmata are large, elongate and blackish, with the plical obliquely before the first discal, some white irroration (sprinkles) above and below the second discal and a very oblique white strigula from the costa before two-thirds, where a very strongly curved fine whitish line runs to the tornus. There is a leaden-grey terminal patch extending to the second discal stigma and cut by this line, marked before the apex by a white spot cut by two black dashes and surrounded by some white irroration. The hindwings are dark fuscous.

References

Commatica
Moths described in 1914